The Superintendent's Residence at Great Sand Dunes National Monument was designed in 1940 by Kenneth R.Saunders and Jerome C. Miller of the National Park Service Branch of Plans and Designs. Built the same year by the Works Progress Administration, the house is in the Territorial Revival style, deemed a suitable local adaptation of the National Park Service Rustic style. The national monument is now Great Sand Dunes National Park and Preserve.  The building is located adjacent to the entrance gate house of the park.

References

Houses on the National Register of Historic Places in Colorado
Houses completed in 1940
National Park Service rustic in Colorado
Houses in Alamosa County, Colorado
Great Sand Dunes National Park and Preserve
Works Progress Administration in Colorado
Territorial Revival architecture
National Register of Historic Places in Alamosa County, Colorado
National Register of Historic Places in national parks